Lesbian, gay, bisexual, and transgender (LGBT) persons in the U.S. state of Indiana enjoy most of the same rights as other people. Same-sex marriage has been legal in Indiana since October 6, 2014, when the U.S. Supreme Court refused to consider an appeal in the case of Baskin v. Bogan.

A landmark April 2017 court ruling held that discrimination based on sexual orientation is tantamount to discrimination on account of "sex", as defined by the Civil Rights Act of 1964. The ruling, issued by the Seventh Circuit Court of Appeals, establishes sexual orientation as a protected characteristic in the workplace, forbidding unfair discrimination. Nevertheless, LGBT rights in Indiana are still quite limited in comparison to other states with much more liberal laws. To this day, state statutes have not yet been amended to include sexual orientation and gender identity among its non-discrimination grounds.

Legality of same-sex sexual activity
In 1795, Indiana as part of the Northwest Territory passed the "buggery" law, which punished male sodomy with death. In 1807, the Indiana Territory enacted a criminal code which included a sodomy provision, eliminating the gender-specifics (meaning it would be applicable to both heterosexual and homosexual conduct), reducing the penalty to one to five years' imprisonment, a fine of 100 to 500 dollars, up to 500 lashes and a permanent loss of civil rights. Sodomy was briefly legal between the years 1852 and 1881, as a new criminal code was passed without any mention to sodomy. In 1881, the state passed a statute outlawing anal intercourse, fellatio (oral sex) as well as masturbation under the age of 21 (which was labelled "self-pollution") for both heterosexuals and homosexuals. Penalty was set at "not more than fourteen years nor less than two years". In the 1923 case of Young v. State, the Indiana Supreme Court unanimously ruled that cunnilingus was also criminal, and in 1939, in Connell v. State, rejected contentions had the statute applied only to homosexual sexual activity.

In 1949, the state passed a psychopathic offender law, under which any person above 16 years of age suffering from a "mental disorder" "coupled with criminal propensities to the commission of sex offenses" would be labelled a "criminal sexual psychopathic person". Those convicted of sodomy would not be able to leave correctional institutions until their "full recovery of criminal psychopathy". A law review article in 1947 showed 160 commitments under the law, of which 60 (38%) were for sodomy and none of the offenders had been a woman. A majority of these commitments were for heterosexual conduct. In 1959, an amendment to the law meant that those refusing to cooperate with examining psychiatrists could be held in contempt of court. In 20 years of operation, only 10 "consensual adult homosexuals" were committed under the law. The law was upheld by the Indiana Supreme Court in 1968 in State ex rel. Haskett v. Marion County Criminal Court, Division One et al. In 1971, the Indiana General Assembly amended the law, removing sodomy from the list of triggering offenses, if consensual and committed with an adult person.

In 1967, in a divided 3-2 ruling, the Indiana Supreme Court upheld as constitutionally sufficient an indictment charging the "abominable and detestable crime against nature". Justice Amos W. Jackson dissented, writing that the

Jackson further wrote that he

In 1968, in Cotner v. Henry, the Seventh Circuit Court of Appeals ruled 2-1 that married couples could not be prosecuted under the sodomy statute. In Dickson v. State (1971), the Indiana Supreme Court upheld the constitutionality of the sodomy law, in a divided 3-2 vote. Dissenting, Justice Roger DeBruler wrote that the

Indiana decriminalized same-sex sexual activity in 1976, effective on July 1, 1977. The age of consent is 16. An attempt to reinstate consensual sodomy as a felony was rejected by a House committee in 1977, by a 6-4 vote.

Recognition of same-sex relationships

Same-sex marriages are recognized and performed in Indiana under a federal court decision in October 2014.

Annual attempts to adopt a constitutional amendment defining marriage as the union of a man and a woman have failed since 2004. Indiana requires that two separately elected legislatures approve an amendment for it to be put to a popular vote. The proposed amendment passed both chambers in 2005, and then again in 2011. On June 25, 2014, U. S. District Court Judge Young declared Indiana's same-sex marriage ban to be unconstitutional, and same-sex couples immediately began to secure marriage licenses. However, the ruling was appealed. On October 6, 2014, the U.S. Supreme Court refused to hear the appeal, effectively legalizing same-sex marriage in Indiana.

Domestic partnerships

There is no recognition of domestic partnerships at the state level in Indiana. Three cities have passed such opportunities.

Bloomington
In 1997, Bloomington established domestic partnerships for unmarried city employees.
Carmel
Carmel has established domestic partnerships for unmarried city employees.
Indianapolis
On August 13, 2012, the Indianapolis City-County Council, in a 20-8 bipartisan vote, established domestic partnerships for all married and unmarried employees in the city and county. On August 23, 2012, Mayor Greg Ballard signed the ordinance into law which went into effect on January 1, 2013.

Discrimination protections

Governor Joe Kernan issued an executive order in 2004 protecting state employees from discrimination based on sexual orientation as well as gender identity and expression. In 2005, Governor Mitch Daniels added the terms "sexual orientation" and "gender identity" to the list of protected categories in state employment covered by the state's Equal Employment Opportunity policy.

In 2013, Kim Hively filed a lawsuit against the Ivy Tech Community College of Indiana in South Bend, arguing that she was denied promotions and let go from her job because of her sexual orientation. The United States Court of Appeals for the Seventh Circuit heard oral arguments in the case, known as Hively v. Ivy Tech Community College, in November 2016 with discussion focusing on the meaning of the word "sex" in Title VII of the Civil Rights Act, which bans workplace discrimination based on race, religion, national origin or sex. On April 4, 2017, the Court of Appeals ruled in an 8-3 vote that the Civil Rights Act of 1964 prohibits employment discrimination on the basis of sexual orientation via the category of "sex". Ivy Tech subsequently stated they would not appeal the ruling to the Supreme Court. Human Rights Campaign hailed the ruling, saying: "Today's ruling is a monumental victory for fairness in the workplace, and for the dignity of lesbian, gay and bisexual Americans who may live in fear of losing their job based on whom they love." The court decision establishes that workplace discrimination on account of sexual orientation (such as in hiring or promotions, etc.) violates federal civil rights law, and is therefore prohibited. The ruling is only binding to the states of Illinois, Indiana and Wisconsin.

The counties of Marion, Monroe, Tippecanoe, and Vanderburgh, along with the cities and towns of Anderson, Bloomington, Carmel, Columbus, Crawfordsville, Evansville, Hammond, Indianapolis, Kokomo, Lafayette, Michigan City, Muncie, Munster, New Albany, South Bend, Terre Haute, Valparaiso, West Lafayette, and Zionsville, have ordinances prohibiting employment discrimination on the basis of sexual orientation and gender identity.

Lake County, Fort Wayne, and Whitestown have ordinances prohibiting employment discrimination on the basis of sexual orientation only.

Religious objections
On March 26, 2015, Governor Mike Pence signed the Religious Freedom Restoration Act (RFRA), also known as the Indiana "religious objections" bill, into law. The law's signing was met with widespread criticism by such organizations as the NCAA, Apple CEO Tim Cook, the gamer convention Gen Con, and the Disciples of Christ. Technology company Salesforce.com said it would halt its plans to expand in the state. Thousands protested against the policy.

On April 2, 2015, Governor Pence signed a measure into law which was intended to be a clarification of the newly enacted legislation. According to The Indianapolis Star:

Gay-Straight Alliances
In December 2021, a federal judge allowed gay-straight alliances to be permitted within public schools. A group of students sued the school in Pendleton for banning gay-straight alliances.

Adoption and parenting
Indiana statutes permit single LGBT persons to adopt. The state Court of Appeals ruled in 2006 that unmarried couples, including same-sex couples, may adopt as well. Local courts also support the right of a same-sex partner to adopt his or her same-sex partner's biological or adopted child.

In 2005, the Indiana Court of Appeals unanimously ruled that lesbian partners who agree to conceive a child through artificial insemination are both the legal parents of any children born to them. Indiana law allows any woman to undergo artificial insemination. The spouse of a pregnant women is generally presumed to be the parent of her child.

On June 30, 2016, a federal judge ruled in Henderson v. Box that Indiana must allow same-sex couples to list both their names on their children's birth certificates. The ruling came as a result of a federal lawsuit filed by eight same-sex couples who were unable to list the non-gestational parent's name on the child's birth certificate. When an opposite-sex couple had a child, the state granted a "presumption of parenthood" to the father and listed him on the birth certificate. However, when a same-sex couple had a child, the state denied that presumption and forced the second partner to undergo an adoption, a "long, arduous and expensive" process. In January 2017, Attorney General Curtis Hill appealed the ruling to the U.S. Court of Appeals for the Seventh Circuit, which unanimously upheld it on January 17, 2020. In December 2020, the SCOTUS declined the case (and that means automatically upheld the previous 7th Circuit rulings).

Surrogacy contracts are "void and unenforceable" in Indiana. While surrogacy is not specifically illegal in the state and can be practiced, courts will generally refuse to recognize such contracts, so intended parents, including same-sex couples, must complete an adoption application.

Gender identity and expression

Identity documents 
Transgender persons may change their legal gender on their Indiana birth certificate. They must get a court order from a court anywhere in the US, submit an application for a birth certificate and a copy of a photo ID to the Corrections Section of the Indiana State Department of Health Vital Records, and pay fees. Gender-affirming surgery is not required.

An "X" gender marker is no longer offered. From March 2019 to January 2020, the Indiana Bureau of Motor Vehicles did offer a "gender X" option on driver's licenses. To request it, applicants needed to present a certified, amended birth certificate that attests to the gender change or a signed, dated physician's statement confirming a permanent gender change. On November 15, 2019, in a public hearing by the Bureau of Motor Vehicles, the policy was overwhelmingly rejected. In March 2020, Indiana Attorney General Curtis Hill published an opinion that the Bureau had overstepped their bounds, and that "only the General Assembly may determine whether the state of Indiana will codify any non-binary designations on state documents".

A 2017 effort to prevent gender marker changes on birth certificates was unsuccessful. On January 12, 2017, Representative Bruce Borders introduced a bill in the Indiana House of Representatives that would have prevented transgender people from doing this. The organization Freedom Indiana objected to the denial of "the very existence of transgender people, the identity they live as and the person they have always known themselves to be." The next day, Representative Cindy Kirchhofer, chair of the House Public Health Committee, denied the bill a hearing, effectively killing it.

Gender-affirming care for minors 
In February 2023, Senate Bill 480 was given a hearing. It would prevent minors from receiving gender-affirming care.

Transgender sports ban
In March 2022, Indiana HB 1041 passed the Indiana General Assembly banning transgender girls in K-12 schools from playing on women's teams. The Governor of Indiana Eric Holcomb vetoed the bill in the same month. 10 US states have implemented similar legislation.

On May 24, 2022, the General Assembly overrode Governor Holcomb's veto, passing the bill into law. The law is expected to be challenged in court.

Hate crime law
Previously, Indiana collected data on "bias crimes", which had included sexual orientation bias since 2003, but did not criminalize them as hate crimes nor alter proposed sentencing requirements due to sexual orientation bias. Such hate crimes, however, are covered federally under the Matthew Shepard and James Byrd Jr. Hate Crimes Prevention Act.

In April 2019, the Indiana General Assembly passed a bill with various controversial and contentious amendments on hate crimes. Unlike other hate crime laws in the United States, Indiana's law does not list specific categories, instead "[making] it an aggravating circumstance that a crime was committed with the intent to harm or intimidate an individual or a group of individuals because of certain perceived or actual characteristics". Governor Eric Holcomb signed the bill into law on April 3. The lack of a specific list of categories drew criticism and claims that it violates the vagueness doctrine. As a result of the law, judges may consider a stricter sentence for someone who committed a crime based on the victim's sexual orientation or gender identity.

Public opinion
A 2017 Public Religion Research Institute (PRRI) opinion poll found that 58% of Indiana residents supported same-sex marriage, while 34% opposed it and 9% were unsure.

The same poll found that 66% of Indiana residents supported an anti-discrimination law covering sexual orientation and gender identity. 25% were opposed. Furthermore, 54% were against allowing public businesses to refuse to serve LGBT people due to religious beliefs, while 37% supported allowing such religiously-based refusals.

Summary table

See also
LGBT rights in the United States

References